The Groșerea is a right tributary of the river Gilort in Romania. It discharges into the Gilort in the village Groșerea.

References

Rivers of Romania
Rivers of Gorj County